Soon after the formation of the Soviet Union, emigration restrictions were put in place to keep citizens from leaving the various countries of the Soviet Socialist Republics, though some defections still occurred. During and after World War II, similar restrictions were put in place in non-Soviet countries of the Eastern Bloc, which consisted of the Communist states of Central and Eastern Europe (except Communist Yugoslavia) and the People's Republic of Mongolia.

Until 1952, however, the Inner German border between East Germany and West Germany could be easily crossed in most places. Accordingly, before 1961, most of that east–west flow took place between East and West Germany, with over 3.5 million East Germans emigrating to West Germany before 1961. On August 13, 1961, a barbed-wire barrier, which would become the Berlin Wall separating East and West Berlin, was erected by East Germany.

Although international movement was, for the most part, strictly controlled, there was a steady loss through escapees who were able to use ingenious methods to evade frontier security. Numerous notable Eastern Bloc citizens defected to non-Eastern Bloc countries.

The following list of Eastern Bloc defectors contains notable defectors from East Germany, the Soviet Union, Poland, Bulgaria, Romania, Czechoslovakia, Hungary, and Albania before those countries' conversions from Communist states in the early 1990s.

List of defections

Defections after 1991

See also
Eastern Bloc emigration and defection
List of Western Bloc defectors

Notes

References

Eastern Bloc
Soviet and Eastern Bloc
Defectors